On the night of January 30, 1969, in Buffalo Narrows Frederick Moses McCallum, 19, broke the door to the Pederson's family home with a long-handled fire axe killing seven people and wounding one.

Events 

Frederick Moses McCallum, 19, broke the door to the Pederson's family home and with a long-handled fire axe killed seven people and wounded one. In the home, he killed the father, mother, family friend, two sons, two daughters, and wounded one son. All the bodies of family members lay in bed and the body of a family friend lay in the living room. After the killings, McCallum called a local priest and told him about the killings. The priest called the police. When police detained McCallum he was sitting in the kitchen and sipping tea. The wounded son after the murders was in a coma for several months. In court, a psychiatrist said McCallum had signs of schizophrenia. McCallum was initially found unfit for criminal responsibility and sent to a psychiatric hospital in Ontario. In 1970, he was allowed to stand trial and McCallum was sent to Prince Albert Penitentiary. After some time he was again diagnosed with schizophrenia and sent to a psychiatric institution in Penetanguishene. In 1989, McCallum was released on condition that he not return to Saskatchewan.

Victims 
In the two-room house the RCMP found the bodies of  
Thomas Pederson age 32
John Baptiste Herman age 48 of La Loche who was a guest
Grace Ann Pederson age 8
Robert Thomas Pederson age 5
Richard Daniel Pederson age 4
Rhonda Beatrice Pederson age 2
Bernadette Pederson age 32, the mother of the children died a few hours later.
Fred Donald Pederson age 7 survived the attack with head injuries.

References

External links
Continuation report

Stabbing attacks in Canada
1969 murders in Canada
Murder in Saskatchewan
Disasters in Saskatchewan
Canadian folklore
Massacres in 1969
Massacres in Canada
Crime in Saskatchewan
1969 in Saskatchewan
January 1969 events in Canada
Family murders